Thomas Dupré (born 9 June 1974) is a former French tennis player.

Dupré has a career high ATP singles ranking of 229 achieved on 22 July 2002. He also has a career high ATP doubles ranking of 423 achieved on 17 March 2003.

Dupré made his ATP main draw debut at the 2002 Tata Open after qualifying for the singles main draw.

References

External links

1974 births
Living people
French male tennis players